Samuel Wilks (1903 – after 1924) was an English footballer who played for Rotherham County. He played 17 games for the club in the Football League, scoring one goal.

References

1903 births
Year of death missing
Place of death missing
Footballers from Sheffield
English footballers
English Football League players
Kiveton Park F.C. players
Rotherham County F.C. players
Association football inside forwards